The 1914–15 Cornell Big Red men's ice hockey season was the 14th season of play for the program.

Season
Talbot Hunter returned to coach the team after two years away, but the program was hampered by not only a lack of local ice but a dearth of willing competitors. Cornell played the fewest games for the program since 1908 and was only able to win one game against the dying program of Columbia.

Roster

Standings

Schedule and Results

|-
!colspan=12 style=";" | Regular Season

References

Cornell Big Red men's ice hockey seasons
Cornell
Cornell
Cornell
Cornell